The 1967 Men's European Volleyball Championship, the seventh edition of the event, was organized by Europe's governing volleyball body, the Confédération Européenne de Volleyball. It was hosted in Istanbul, Ankara, İzmir and Adana, Turkey from October 26 to November 8, 1967.

Teams

Final ranking

References
 Results(  2009-07-21)

Men's European Volleyball Championships
European Championship
Sports competitions in Istanbul
Sports competitions in Ankara
Sports competitions in Izmir
Sport in Adana
1960s in Istanbul
1960s in Ankara
20th century in İzmir